Love Likes Coincidences 2 is a 2020 Turkish romantic drama film directed by Ömer Faruk Sorak and İpek Sorak.

Cast 
 Nesrin Cavadzade (Defne)
 Yiğit Kirazcı (Kerem)
 Elif Doğan (Die Junga Sema)
 Aytaç Şaşmaz (Der Junge Niko)
 Hülya Gülşen Irmak (Nuran)
 Levent Can (Yorgo)
 Türkü Turan (Aylin)
 Eli Mango (Marika)
 Zuhal Olcay (Sema)
 Uğur Polat (Niko)
 Erkan Can (Kemal)

References

External links 
 

2020 films
2020 romantic drama films
Turkish romantic drama films
2020s Turkish-language films
Films set in Turkey
Films scored by Ozan Çolakoğlu
Turkish sequel films